George Frederick II, Margrave of Brandenburg-Ansbach (3 May 1678 – 29 March 1703), known as George Frederick the Younger, the third son of John Frederick, Margrave of Brandenburg-Ansbach by his first wife the Margravine Joanna Elisabeth of Baden-Durlach (and thus a half-brother of Queen Caroline of Great Britain), succeeded his elder brother as Margrave of Ansbach in 1692.

In the War of the Palatinian Succession he fought from 1695 to 1697 as a volunteer in the Imperial Army.  During the Spanish War of Succession in 1702 he succeeded in taking the fortress Bersello Modena.  He was killed at the Battle of Kittensee in 1703, and as he was unmarried, Ansbach passed to his younger half-brother William Frederick.

Ancestry 

Friedrich II, Georg
Friedrich II, Georg
House of Hohenzollern
Margraves of Brandenburg-Ansbach
Generals of the Holy Roman Empire